Mirko Marjanović (2 May 1926 – unknown) was the Serbian basketball player and coach. He represented the Yugoslavia national basketball team internationally.

Playing career 
Marjanović played for Belgrade-based teams the Yugoslav Army and Partizan of the Yugoslav First League. In the 1945 season, he won the Yugoslav Championships with the Yugoslav Army.

In June 1951, Marjanović played two games for Crvena zvezda at an international cup tournament in Milan, Italy. On 18 June, he recorded 10 points in a 46–35 loss to Borletti Milano. On the following day, he recorded 17 points in a 54–24 win over Ginnastica Roma.

National team career 
Marjanović was a member of the Yugoslavia national basketball team at the 1947 FIBA European Championship in Prague, Czechoslovakia. Over five tournament games, he averaged 9.2 points per game. At the 1953 FIBA European Championship in Moscow, the Soviet Union, he averaged 6.5 points per game over eleven tournament games.

Marjanović was a Yugoslav team member at the 1954 FIBA World Championship in Rio de Janeiro, Brazil. Over five tournament games, he averaged 4.2 points per game.

Coaching career 
As player-coach Marjanović coached Partizan for the last four seasons while he played for them.

Coaching record

Yugoslav First Men's Basketball League

See also 
List of KK Partizan head coaches

References

External links 
 Partizanopedia

1926 births
Centers (basketball)
KK Crvena zvezda players
KK Partizan players
KK Partizan coaches
Player-coaches
Yugoslav men's basketball players
Yugoslav basketball coaches
1954 FIBA World Championship players
Year of death missing
Place of birth missing
Place of death missing